Kolinger is a German surname. Notable people with the surname include:

Denis Kolinger (born 1994), German-born Croatian footballer 
Dubravko Kolinger (born 1975), German footballer

See also
Klinger (surname)

German-language surnames